The Promise Ring (subtitled "Songs of New Eireland") is the eleventh solo album by Yes lead singer Jon Anderson, released in June 1997 on the OM Town label.

Overview
The Promise Ring is a collection of songs of Celtic music composed by Jon Anderson and the Froggin' Peach Orchestra, a Celtic music local band based at the San Luis Obispo's Frog 'n Peach Pub.

In the inner booklet, Jon Anderson reveals that he "always wanted to sing about the Celtic knowledge" and that "one night, [he] dreamed about these lyrics and the songs of Eireland, as if [he] was in the year 2002 and Eire was once again One Country", hence the lyrics "2002" in the chorus of the title song "The Promise Ring".

Artwork

Track listing
All songs written by Jon Anderson and the Froggin' Peach Orchestra.

"Born To Dance" (3:57)
"Flowers of the Morning" (4:17)
"Timing of the Known" (5:31)
"True Life Song" (4:18) 
"Are You?" (3:46)
"My Sweet Jane" (3:35)
"True Hands of Fate" (5:20)
"The Promise Ring" (5:30)
"O'er" (3:02)

Jon Anderson dedicated the album "to [his] mum and dad for giving [him] this love of life".

Personnel
Jon Anderson - vocals, lyrics and melodies 
Jane Luttenberger Anderson - duet vocals
The Froggin' Peach Orchestra: 
Brooks Hill - guitars, orchestra leader 
Paul Beeler - guitar 
Paul Welch - guitar 
Karen Peterson - guitar, flute, orchestration 
Christine Dewees - guitar 
Julie Cooper - fiddle
Marlene Beeles - fiddle
Gary Atkinson - fiddle
Mary McCluskey - fiddle, dulcimer on "O'er" 
Chris Scott - flute
Mikey Green - flute
Dreima Barker - pennywhistle 
Dave Dewees - pennywhistle, mandolin 
Inga Swearingen - spoons 
Adam Hunter - bodhrán 
Charlie Perryess - upright bass 
Bruce Powers - dulcimer 
Laura Cooper - keyboards 
Marty Lau - drums 
Tim Costa - percussion 
Dave Lewicki - mandolin 
Miles Clark - mandolin 
Jonas Richardson - mandolin 
Peter Richardson - mandolin 
Peter Morin - mandolin 
Cathy Harvey - keyboards 
Alan Dick - violin 
Dan the Mystic - storyteller 
John Bartelt - guitar on "My Sweet Jane"

Production
Produced by Jon Anderson 
Executive producers: Matt Marshall & Dan Selene 
Sonic Solutions Engineer: Kevin Dickey 
Engineer: Matt May 
Sound Coordinator: Greg Notley 
Recorded (live) at the Frog 'n Peach Pub (during "those wonderful evenings") & at Opio Studio - San Luis Obispo, CA
Digitally Reassembled & Edited by William Aura at Auravision Studios 
Mastered by William Aura at Quad Teck Digital - L.A., CA
Art Direction & Design: Benjamin Cziller 
Production Assistance & Calligraphy: Nancy Forrest 
Production Director: Maria Ehrenreich 
Sr. VP, Sales & Marketing: Scott Bergstein 
Manager, Artist Development & Promotion: Jo Ann Klass-Gerstein

References

External links

1997 albums
Concept albums
Jon Anderson albums
Celtic music